Ali Alizadeh (born May 3, 1981) is an Iranian former football player. He was born in Rafsenjan, Kerman. His playing position was forward. He has played for Mess Rafsenjan, Mess. Kerman, Fajr Sepasi Shiraz and Perspolis Tehran, before joining Esteghlal Tehran. He has also played for Bargh Shiraz and Tractor. He then decided to play for Mess Kerman as his last football club and then he retired when he was 36.

Club career

Club career statistics
Last Update  30 September 2011 

 Assist Goals

Honours
Iran's Premier Football League
Winner: 1
2008/09 with Esteghlal
Hazfi Cup
Winner: 1
2008 with Esteghlal
Runner up: 1
2003 with Fajr Sepasi

External links
  Interview with Khanevadeye Sabz Magazine

1981 births
Living people
Iranian footballers
Persian Gulf Pro League players
Azadegan League players
Esteghlal F.C. players
Persepolis F.C. players
Fajr Sepasi players
Bargh Shiraz players
Tractor S.C. players
Association football forwards